Putu may refer to:

Food
 Piutu or putu, a cassava dish from the Sama-Bajau of the Philippines and Sabah
 Puto, steamed rice cakes from the Philippines
 Putu bambu, a rice cake steamed in bamboo from Indonesia
 Putu mayam, a sweet rice dish from southern India

Other
 Putu, Estonia, a village in Mustvee Parish, Jõgeva County
 Putu, Iran, a village
 Putu Sukreta Suranta, a Hindu religious figure in Indonesia
 Putu Wijaya (born 1944), Indonesian author